Day of Days may refer to:

Film and television 
 The Day of Days (film), a lost 1914 American adaptation of Louis Joseph Vance's novel (see below)
 Day of Days (film), a 2016 American film starring Tom Skerritt
 The Day of Days (TV series), a 2013 Hong Kong drama series
 "Day of Days" (Band of Brothers), a television episode
 "Day of Days" (WWII in HD), a television episode

Literature
 "A Day of Days", an 1866 short story by Henry James
 The Day of Days, a 1913 novel by Louis Joseph Vance

Music 
 Day of Days (album), by Runrig, 2004
 "Day of Days", a song by Runrig from Proterra, 2003
 "Day of Days", a song by Ben Onono, 2008

Sport
 Day of days, 25 May 1935 so is remembered the day when Jesse Owens established 4 world records in the athletics

See also 
 D-Day (military term), the day on which a combat attack or operation is to be initiated